Wilmot Vaughan, 1st Earl of Lisburne (1728 – 6 January 1800), of Trawsgoed, Cardiganshire, known as Viscount Lisburne from 1766 to 1776, was a Welsh peer and politician.

Lisburne was the son of Wilmot Vaughan, 3rd Viscount Lisburne, and was educated at Eton College.

On 30 Jan 1750/1, he was commissioned an ensign in the 2nd Regiment of Foot Guards. He resigned his commission in December 1754.

He was elected to the House of Commons for Cardiganshire in 1755, a seat he held until 1761 and again from 1768 to 1791 and also represented Berwick-upon-Tweed between 1765 and 1768. He served as a Lord of Trade in 1768 and as a Lord of the Admiralty from 1770 to 1782. Lisburne succeeded his father as fourth Viscount Lisburne in 1766 but as this was an Irish peerage it did not prohibit him from sitting in the House of Commons. 

Apart from his political career he was also Lord Lieutenant of Cardiganshire from 1762 to his death. On 5 July 1759, he was created a DCL by Oxford. In 1776 he was honoured when he was created Earl of Lisburne, also in the Peerage of Ireland. 

Lord Lisburne died in January 1800 and was succeeded in his titles by his eldest son Wilmot. His second son John became the 3rd Earl. His daughter Dorothy Elizabeth married Sir Lawrence Palk, 2nd Baronet.

Footnotes

References
Morgan, Gerald, The Vaughans of Trawsgoed, 1997, Gomer Press, 
Kidd, Charles, Williamson, David (editors). Debrett's Peerage and Baronetage (1990 edition). New York: St Martin's Press, 1990.

1728 births
1800 deaths
People educated at Eton College
Lord-Lieutenants of Cardiganshire
Lords of the Admiralty
Lisburne, Wilmot Vaughan, 4th Viscount
Members of the Parliament of Great Britain for Welsh constituencies
Vaughan, Wilmot
Lisburne, Wilmot Vaughan, 4th Viscount
Lisburne, Wilmot Vaughan, 4th Viscount
British MPs 1774–1780
British MPs 1780–1784
British MPs 1784–1790
British MPs 1790–1796
1
Wilmot
Coldstream Guards officers